Murder in Delaware constitutes the intentional killing, under circumstances defined by law, of people within or under the jurisdiction of the U.S. state of Delaware.

The United States Centers for Disease Control and Prevention reported that in the year 2020, the state had a murder rate somewhat above the median for the entire country.

Definitions

First-degree murder 
Delaware has eight different levels of homicide offenses in total, although some overlap. The most serious form of homicide, first-degree murder, constitutes the intentional killing of a person without legal justification or an unintentional killing during the commission of a felony (the felony murder rule). Additionally, Delaware is one of the only states where intentionally causing someone to commit suicide is punishable as first-degree murder. The crime of first-degree murder is punishable for those over the age of 18 only by life imprisonment without the possibility of parole. The state previously punished first-degree murder by either life-without-parole or the death penalty, but Delaware's death penalty statute was ruled unconstitutional in 2016. In 2013, Delaware passed legislation eliminating life-without-parole sentences for first-degree murders committed while the perpetrator was under the age of 18. For juveniles, the sentence is a minimum of 25 years in prison and a maximum of life imprisonment with the possibility of parole.

Felony murder rule 
Like most states, Delaware employs the standard of the felony murder rule. A murder where a victim dies during or shortly after the commission (or attempted commission) of a felony due to the offender's reckless conduct is punished as first-degree murder.

Second-degree murder 
Second-degree murder under Delaware law is the killing of a victim when the perpetrator recklessly causes the death of another person under circumstances which manifest a cruel, wicked, and depraved indifference to human life. It is punishable by a minimum of 15 years in prison and a maximum of life imprisonment.

Murder by abuse or neglect 
Two other forms of murder in Delaware law are first- and second-degree murder by abuse or neglect of a minor. First-degree murder by abuse or neglect constitutes when a perpetrator recklessly causes the death of a child through an act of abuse and/or neglect of the child or when the perpetrator has engaged in a previous pattern of abuse and/or neglect of the child. It is punishable by 15 years to life imprisonment, the same as second-degree murder. Second-degree murder by abuse or neglect constitutes when a perpetrator causes the death of a child through criminal negligence. It is punishable by 2 to 25 years in prison, the same as manslaughter.

Penalties 
The sentences for homicide offenses in Delaware are listed below.

References 

U.S. state criminal law
Delaware law
Murder in Delaware